Closure is the ninth studio album by American metalcore band Attila. The album was released on July 23, 2021, a year after it was recorded. Rhythm guitarist Walter Adams and Tyler Kruckmeyer joined the band for this album, the latter replacing Bryan McClure, who was fired from the band following several rape and sexual misconduct allegations. Attila will be touring in support of the album from August to October.

Track listing

Personnel
Chris "Fronz" Fronzak – vocals
Chris Linck – lead guitar
Walter Adams – rhythm guitar
Kalan Blehm – bass guitar
Tyler Kruckmeyer – drums

References

2021 albums
Attila (metalcore band) albums